Raising Victor Vargas is a 2002 American comedy-drama film directed by Peter Sollett, written by Sollett and Eva Vives. The film follows Victor, a Lower East Side teenager, as he deals with his eccentric family, including his strict grandmother, his bratty sister, and a younger brother who completely idolizes him. Along the way he tries to win the affections of Judy, who is very careful and calculating when it comes to how she deals with men. In a subplot, Judy's friend Melonie is depicted in her own romantic adventure. The film was screened in the Un Certain Regard section at the 2002 Cannes Film Festival.

Plot
Victor is a teenager growing up in the Lower East Side of New York City. He is a cocky young man who is very sure of himself in his love life. He lives in a small apartment with his strict grandmother, bratty sister Vicki, and his younger brother Nino, who is just coming into his own sexuality and looks up to his girl-crazy brother.

At the beginning of the film, Victor is found in the bedroom of Fat Donna, a girl that many in the neighborhood consider unattractive. Word quickly spreads throughout the community amongst his friends, although Victor continuously denies it happened. Seeing this as huge threat to his reputation, he sets his sights on the beautiful girl of the neighborhood, Judy.

Judy is a good-looking young woman who is continuously hit on by men in her neighborhood, which makes her very cautious in who she chooses in terms of her love life. When Victor comes on to her, she lies, telling him she already has a boyfriend. When Victor finds out this isn't true, he enlists the help of Judy's little brother Carlos, on the condition that Victor introduce him to Victor's sister Vicki, who Carlos is attracted to. Judy ultimately says yes to Victor's advances to keep her safe from the other boys that harass and follow her constantly.

During this time, we also see Judy's friend Melonie and her romantic dealings with Harold, Victor's friend. Their romance ultimately results in their sleeping together, and Melonie reveals to Harold the real reasons why Judy agreed to go out with Victor. Harold tells Victor, who goes to confront Judy. When Victor invites her over to dinner at his house, she believes he's doing so to impress his family and better his reputation. Things go wrong when Victor's grandmother recognizes the lipstick on the glass from Judy's earlier visit to their apartment, and becomes irate. Judy leaves, the grandmother tells Victor if he goes after the girl that she will change the locks. He goes after her, of course. Ultimately, they decide to stay together, with Victor saying that he invited her to see his family to see who he really is. When Victor returns to his apartment, the grandmother has not kicked him out. He makes peace with her, and the family is able to come together with a greater understanding of each other as individuals, and as a family unit.

Production
The film was adapted from Sollett's 2000 autobiographical short film Five Feet High and Rising.  Shooting took place on location in the Lower East Side, where spacing concerns necessitated the use of 16mm film cameras.

Reception 

On Rotten Tomatoes, the film holds a 96% rating based on 110 reviews, and an average rating of 7.98/10. The site's consensus reads, "A coming-of-age tale marked by its authenticity." On Metacritic, the film holds a score of 83%, based on 31 critics, indicating "universal acclaim".

Roger Ebert praised the film for its actors and the relationship between the film's main characters, writing that the film "tells the heartwarming story of first love that finds a balance between lust and idealism. Acted by fresh-faced newcomers who never step wrong, it sidesteps the cliches of teenage coming-of-age movies and expands into truth and human comedy. It's the kind of movie you know you can trust, and you give yourself over to affection for these characters who are so lovingly observed."

References

External links
 
 

2002 films
2000s coming-of-age comedy-drama films
2002 independent films
American coming-of-age comedy-drama films
American independent films
Films about dysfunctional families
Films set in Manhattan
Films shot in New York City
Films directed by Peter Sollett
Fireworks Entertainment films
2002 directorial debut films
2002 comedy films
2002 drama films
2000s English-language films
2000s American films